The Zion Brick Missionary Church is a historic church in Hopkins County, Kentucky near Hanson. It was built in 1870 and added to the National Register of Historic Places in 1988.

The church was organized in 1867.  Its building is a one-story brick structure built in 1870 with brick laid in six-course common bond.  A one-story frame addition was added to at the rear, around 1940.

It is "the oldest standing Baptist Church in the county and its only example of rural brick church architecture."

References

Churches on the National Register of Historic Places in Kentucky
Italianate architecture in Kentucky
Churches completed in 1870
National Register of Historic Places in Hopkins County, Kentucky
Italianate church buildings in the United States
Baptist churches in Kentucky
1870 establishments in Kentucky